Shakespeare Theatre could refer to:

American Shakespeare Center, Staunton Virginia
American Shakespeare Theatre, Stratford, Connecticut
Royal Shakespeare Theatre, Stratford-upon-Avon
Shakespeare Theatre Company of Washington, D.C.
Shakespeare Theatre of New Jersey
Shakespeare's original Globe Theatre
Its modern reconstruction, Shakespeare's Globe Theatre
Elizabethan theatre in general

See also
Shakespeare Theatre Association of America